Tinarie van Wyk-Loots (born 17 December 1980 in Johannesburg, South Africa) is an actress known for her roles in War of the Worlds and Mojave Phone Booth.

Filmography

Film

Television

External links

Living people
1980 births
21st-century South African actresses
Actresses from Johannesburg
South African film actresses
White South African people